Sarvodaya Enclave is an affluent residential colony in the South Delhi District of New Delhi, capital of India.

Places of interest 
The colony has several beautiful houses that attracts architects and interior decorators from around geographies. It also has a Temple and Gurdwara within its boundaries. Adjacent to the colony there is Sri Aurobindo Ashram, Delhi Branch, The Mother's International School, and Mirambika Free Progress School. There is also an extension of UCO Bank within the Ashram boundaries.
The colony is very green and houses many known veterans of diverse fields.

DDA Market
A small market inside the colony serves the residents of the colony with basic needs like Medicines, Groceries and Stationery. There is also a cyber cafe, photocopying and courier shops in the market.

South Delhi district
Neighbourhoods in Delhi